Keathley Canyon is an undersea canyon in the United States Exclusive Economic Zone in the Gulf of Mexico. The canyon is named for the hydrographic survey ship USNS Sergeant George D. Keathley (T-AGS-35).

The Canyon is rich in oil fields. The major oilfields at the Keathley Canyon are Tiber, Kaskida, Lucius, and Buckskin. Many oil companies, including Chevron Corporation, BP,  Anadarko Petroleum, ExxonMobil, Repsol, Shell, Devon Energy, BHP, Eni, Navitas Petroleum and Total have leased the rights to drill for oil in this area.

The find was "the company’s first deepwater exploration well following a U.S. moratorium" after the Deepwater Horizon explosion and oil spill in the Gulf in 2010 and "one of the largest discoveries in the Gulf ... in the last decade." "Exxon holds a 50% working interest in four ... blocks. Units owned by Petrobras and Eni hold a 25% interest in three of the blocks. Petrobras also owns 50% of one of the blocks."

References

Submarine canyons of the Gulf of Mexico
Gulf of Mexico oil fields of the United States